Vratislav Gajdoš (born 13 January 1986) is a Slovak football midfielder who plays for OFK Veľký Lapáš.

External links
FK Dukla profile

References

1986 births
Living people
Slovak footballers
FK Dukla Banská Bystrica players
FK Senica players
FC Nitra players
OFK 1948 Veľký Lapáš players
Association football midfielders
Slovak Super Liga players
Sportspeople from Nitra